Mel Greig (born 19 September 1982) is an Australian radio and television personality.

Career
In 2011, she competed on the first season of The Amazing Race Australia with her sister Alana. In 2012, Greig began co-hosting the Hot30 Countdown show on 2Day FM with Matty Acton, who was later replaced by Mike Christian.

Royal prank

In December 2012, Greig and Christian broadcast a prank call they had made to King Edward VII Hospital, where Catherine, Duchess of Cambridge was staying, posing as the Queen and Prince Charles. It later transpired that one of the nurses who answered the call, Jacintha Saldanha, as a result of being duped by the DJs and the subsequent media attention, later died by suicide. Greig made a statement at the inquest, while 2Day FM has, to date, rejected any blame for Saldanha's death. The show was then cancelled on 12 December. In an interview with ITV's This Morning programme, Greig said that she was the victim of a "witch hunt".

Post radio show
In 2015, Greig was a contestant on the fourth season of The Celebrity Apprentice Australia. She was fired after Task 8. In January 2016, Greig began co-hosting the 96.5 Wave FM breakfast show, The Hot Breakfast, with Travis Winks. She had taken a three-year hiatus following the royal prank call incident.

Greig left Wave FM to move back to Sydney in 2018, citing personal reasons.

Greig writes an online dating column for Yahoo Be and has contributed articles to Mamamia, an Australian women's website.

Greig has endometriosis and is an ambassador for the non-profit organisation Endometriosis Australia.

References

External links
 

1982 births
Australian radio personalities
Australian television personalities
Women television personalities
Living people
The Amazing Race contestants
The Apprentice Australia candidates
People with Endometriosis